William Schley (December 15, 1786 – November 20, 1858) was an American lawyer, jurist, and politician.

Biography
Schley was born on December 15 (some sources say December 10), 1786 in Frederick, Maryland, the original locus and domicile of the Schley family in North America. With others of the family he migrated to Augusta, Georgia, in the early 19th century, where he was educated at the academies of Louisville and Augusta, Georgia. He later studied law, was admitted to the bar in 1812 and practiced law in Augusta. From 1825 through 1828 he was a Superior Court judge of the Middle District in Georgia.

In 1830 William Schley became a member of the Georgia House of Representatives. In 1832 and again in 1834, he was elected as a Democrat to the United States House of Representatives. He resigned from that position to become the 36th Governor of Georgia  from 1835 until 1837.

During his gubernatorial term, Schley initiated the creation of the Western and Atlantic Railroad. He also advocated the establishment of a lunatic asylum and a geological survey of the state. Schley published a Digest of the English Statutes in Force in Georgia (Philadelphia, 1826). He was an ardent Democrat and strict constructionist.

He died in Augusta in 1858 and was buried in that same city in the Schley family cemetery. Schley County, Georgia is named his honor.

Notes

References

Georgia State Archives Roster of State Governors
 Georgia Governor's Gravesites Field Guide (1776-2003)
Georgia Secretary of State official website

External links

Stuart A. Rose Manuscript, Archives, and Rare Book Library, Emory University: William Schley papers, 1826-1840

1786 births
1858 deaths
Democratic Party members of the Georgia House of Representatives
Democratic Party governors of Georgia (U.S. state)
Politicians from Augusta, Georgia
Politicians from Frederick, Maryland
Jacksonian members of the United States House of Representatives from Georgia (U.S. state)
American slave owners
19th-century American politicians